Gerard Pieter van As (born 12 November 1944, in Gouda) is a Dutch politician. From 2002 to 2006 he was a member of Pim Fortuyn List (LPF) in the Dutch House of Representatives. He also served as parliamentary chairman of the LPF from 2004 to 2006.

Career
Van As studied law at the University of Leiden. He then worked in property law and as a real estate broker. From the 1970s to the early 1990s, he served on the municipal council of Alphen aan den Rijn for the VVD. From 1982 to 1993, he was an alderman of Alphen aan den Rijn. In 2002, he cancelled his membership of the VVD and joined the Pim Fortuyn List. During the 2002 Dutch general election, he was elected to parliament for the LPF. In parliament, he focused on finance and government expenditure. From 2004 to 2006, he served as party leader of the LPF.

On 16 August 2006, he abandoned the LPF after a conflict with the party's leadership and joined Nawijn Group and unsuccessfully stood as a candidate for Nawijn's Party for the Netherlands.

Van As retired from parliament in 2006. In 2010 Van As took part in the municipal elections in Alphen aan den Rijn for the new localist party Nieuw Elan. He once again became alderman in 2013.

References
  Parlement.com biography

1944 births
Living people
Independent politicians in the Netherlands
Members of the House of Representatives (Netherlands)
Aldermen in South Holland
People from Alphen aan den Rijn
People from Gouda, South Holland
People's Party for Freedom and Democracy politicians
Pim Fortuyn List politicians
21st-century Dutch politicians